The 2023 UCI Cyclo-cross World Championships were held between the 3rd and 5th of February 2023 in Hoogerheide, Netherlands.

Medal summary

Medals table

References

UCI Cyclo-cross World Championships
World Championships
UCI
UCI